The Orland River is a  river in the town of Orland in Hancock County, Maine. It is part of the Penobscot River watershed.

Background 
The Orland River is primarily tidal and is known upstream from tidewater as the Narramissic River.

Orland River Day 
Orland River Day is held in June. The day consists of raft races, games, food, and a parade. Orland River Day was first established in 1975 and is currently holding it's 45th anniversary as of June 2020.

See also
List of rivers of Maine

References

Maine Streamflow Data from the USGS
Maine Watershed Data From Environmental Protection Agency
Orland River Day Website

Tributaries of the Penobscot River
Rivers of Maine